Mevissen may refer to:

 Gerhard Mevissen (*1956) German artist
 Gustav von Mevissen (1815–1899), German enterpriser and politician